Grzegorz Oprządek (born 7 June 1943) was a Polish footballer who played as a defender.

Biography

Born in Warsaw, Oprządek moved to Gdańsk at an early age. He began playing football on the streets or in the back gardens of his friends in Gdańsk. His father became a fan of Lechia Gdańsk and started taking Oprządek to games at a young age. From 1958 to 1962 he trained with the Lechia youth teams before moving to the first team in 1963. Oprządek spent his professional career playing for Lechia Gdańsk for four years between 1963 and 1967. His first season with Lechia was spent in the I liga, Poland's top division. He made his I liga and professional debut on 24 March 1963 in the 1–0 defeat to Odra Opole. Lechia were relegated at the end of the season, with Oprządek making 12 appearances and scoring one goal. His next four seasons were spent in the II liga, making an additional 30 appearances and 3 goals in the league. In total Oprządek made 43 appearances and scored 4 goals in all competitions during his time at Lechia, retiring from playing professional football in 1967.

References

1943 births
Living people
Lechia Gdańsk players
Ekstraklasa players
Association football defenders
Polish footballers